Jan Soukup (born September 17, 1979) is a Czech karateka, the branch chief for International Karate Organization Kyokushinkaikan in Czech Republic, the president of the Czech Kyokushin Karate Association and the vice president of the Czech Fullcontact Karate Organization, and also a retired  kickboxer who competed in the heavyweight division. Soukup's first noteworthy accomplishment was a third-place finish at the European Kyokushin Championships in 2003 and he followed this by winning the All-Japan Kyokushin Championships the next year. After finishing as runner-up in the European Championships and in third place in the European Open in 2005, Soukup had his most successful year in 2007 when he won the European Championships and lost to Ewerton Teixeira in the final of the 9th Kyokushin World Open. Beginning in 2008, he embarked on a career in kickboxing which included a stint in K-1.

Career

Karate career (2001–2007)
Jan Soukup began his karate training in Shotokan at the age of eleven before moving to Kagoshima, Japan in April 2001 to study Kyokushin in an uchi-deshi program. After training for four years and attaining the rank of second dan black belt, which he earned by completing a twenty-man kumite among other tests, he returned to the Czech Republic and opened his own Kyokushin dojo in August 2005.

During this period, Soukup also achieved respectable finishes in numerous tournaments; in 2003, he finished in third place in the +90 kg/198 lb division at the 17th European Kyokushin Championships, in 2004 he won the 21st All-Japan Kyokushin Championships at +90 kg/198 lb and 2005 saw him take bronze at the 5th Kyokushin European Open and silver at the 21st European Kyokushin Championships.

Soukup had his most successful year in 2007 when he won the 21st European Kyokushin Championships at +90 kg/198 lb and finished as runner-up in the 9th edition of most prestigious tournament in the sport, the Kyokushin World Open. He avenged his loss to Arthur Hovhannisyan, who beat him in the final of the European Championships back in 2005, in the semi-finals before losing out to Ewerton Teixeira via low kick ippon in the final.

Transition to kickboxing (2008-2019)
Making the transition to professional kickboxing, Jan Soukup debuted in his native Czech Republic in 2008 with a first round knockout of Tonda Ungerman. Following this, he was recruited by K-1 and returned to Japan to train under Jayson Vemoa at the Ichigeki Academy where his sparring partners included Glaube Feitosa, Takumi Sato and former foe Ewerton Teixeira.

In his first K-1 match, Soukup faced reigning K-1 Heavyweight Champion Keijiro Maeda in non-title bout at the K-1 World Grand Prix 2009 in Tokyo Final 16 Qualifying GP in Tokyo, Japan on August 11, 2009. He was dropped with a short right hand towards the end of round two before being knocked out with a right hook in three.

After rebounding with a unanimous decision win over Espedito da Silva at Ichigeki Brazil 2009 in São Paulo, Brazil on October 3, 2009, he returned to K-1 to fight Tsutomu Takahagi in a non-tournament match at the K-1 World Grand Prix 2009 Final in Yokohama, Japan on December 5, 2009, and won by a second consecutive unanimous decision. In his third and final outing in the promotion, Soukup lost to Mladen Brestovac by way of unanimous decision after being knocked down with a third round knee strike in the tournament reserve match at the K-1 World Grand Prix 2010 in Bucharest in Romania on May 21, 2010.

Soukup lost his second fight in a row when he dropped a unanimous decision to Jhonata Diniz after surviving knockdowns in rounds one and three at Ichigeki Brazil 2010 in São Paulo on July 31, 2010.

After over a year out of the ring, Soukup made his comeback to enter the RISE Heavyweight Tournament 2011 held at RISE 85 in Tokyo on November 23, 2011. He had a close fight with Fabiano Cyclone in the quarter-finals but scoring a knockdown in round two was enough to earn him the nod via majority decision and advance to the semis where he faced Makoto Uehara. This was another closely contested affair and was called a majority draw after the regulation three rounds. With the fight going to an extension round to decide the winner, Uehara did enough to take a unanimous decision and eliminate Soukup from the tournament.

Championships and awards

Kickboxing
2014 Yangame's Fight Night Heavyweight Tournament Champion +94,1 kg

Karate

Kyokushin
All-Japan Kyokushin Championships
21st All-Japan Kyokushin Championships +90 kg/198 lb Champion 
European Kyokushin Championships
17th European Kyokushin Championships +90 kg/198 lb 3rd Place 
19th European Kyokushin Championships +90 kg/198 lb Runner-up  (Lost to Artur Hovhannisyan)
21st European Kyokushin Championships +90 kg/198 lb Champion  (Defeated Petar Martinov)
Kyokushin European Open
5th Kyokushin European Open 3rd Place 
Kyokushin World Open
9th Kyokushin World Open Runner-up  (Lost to Ewerton Teixeira)

Shotokan Karate
Shotokan Karate Bohemia Cup
Shotokan Karate Bohemia Cup 2000 (Prague Team) 3rd Place 
Shotokan Karate Scandinavia Cup
Shotokan Karate Scandinavia Cup 1999 3rd Place 
Shotokan Karate World Cup
Shotokan Karate World Cup 1999 (-Mladá Boleslav) Champion

Kickboxing record

|- bgcolor="#CCFFCC"
|2019-11-01 || Win || align=left|  Timur Gastashev || Battle of Champions 11 || Moscow, Russia || Decision (Unanimous) || 4 || 3:00 || 15-8

|- bgcolor="#fbb"
|2019-03-29 || Loss || align=left|  Bahram Rajabzadeh || XFN LEGENDS || Prague, Czech Republic || KO (Right cross) || 2 || 0:18|| 14-8

|-  bgcolor="#CCFFCC"
| 2018-07-26 || Win || align=left| Peter Aerts || Yangames 6 || Prague, The Czech Republic || Decision (Unanimous) || 3 || 3:00 || 14-7
|-
|-  bgcolor="#FFBBBB"
| 2018-04-19 || Loss || align=left| Hao Guanghua || XFN: Czechia vs China || Prague, The Czech Republic || Decision (Unanimous) || 3 || 3:00 || 13-7
|-
|-  bgcolor="#FFBBBB"
| 2016-10-08 || Loss || align=left| Freddy Kemayo || W5 Grand Prix "Legends in Prague" || Prague, The Czech Republic || KO || 3 ||  || 13-6
|-
|-  bgcolor="#CCFFCC"
| 2015-12-19 || Win ||align=left| Donegi Abena || Večer Bojovníků Thajského Boxu VII.|| Liberec, Czech Republic || Decision (Unanimous) || 3 || 3:00 || 13-5
|-
|-  bgcolor="#CCFFCC"
| 2015-11-07 || Win ||align=left| Georgi Fibich || Night Of Warriors 8 || Liberec, Czech Republic || Decision (Unanimous) || 3 || 3:00 || 12-5
|-
|-  bgcolor="#FFBBBB"
| 2015-09-26 || Loss ||align=left| Ondrej Hutnik || Mistroství ČR v K1 WAKO pro || Prague, Czech Republic|| Decision (unanimous) || 3 || 3:00 || 11-5
|-
|-  bgcolor="#CCFFCC"
| 2015-07-30 || Win ||align=left| Luboš Raušer  || Yangame's Fight Night 3 || Prague, Czech Republic || Decision (Unanimous) || 3 || 3:00 || 11-4
|-
|-  bgcolor="#CCFFCC"
| 2015-05-30 || Win ||align=left| Toni Milanović ||Obračun u Ringu 13 || Split, Croatia || Decision (Unanimous) || 3 || 3:00 || 10-4
|-
|-  bgcolor="#CCFFCC"
| 2015-04-25 || Win ||align=left| Mario Jagatić || Night Of Warriors 7 || Liberec, Czech Republic || Decision (Unanimous) || 3 || 3:00 || 9-4
|-
|-  bgcolor="#CCFFCC"
| 2014-12-11 || Win ||align=left| Faycal Hucin || Noc Válečníků || Kladno, Czech Republic || Ext. R. Decision || 4 || 3:00 || 8-4
|-
|-  bgcolor="#CCFFCC"
| 2014-07-31 || Win ||align=left| Radovan Kulla || Yangame's Fight Night, Final Fight || Prague, Bohemia, Czech Republic || KO (low kicks) || 1 ||  || 7-4
|-
! style=background:white colspan=9 |
|-
|-  bgcolor="#CCFFCC"
| 2014-07-31 || Win ||align=left| Jiří Havránek || Yangame's Fight Night, Semi Finals || Prague, Bohemia, Czech Republic || KO (spinning hook kick) || 1 ||  || 6-4
|-
|-  bgcolor="#CCFFCC"
| 2014-07-31 || Win ||align=left| Peter Baláž || Yangame's Fight Night, Quarter Finals || Prague, Bohemia, Czech Republic || KO (high kick) || 1 ||  || 5-4
|-
|-  bgcolor="#FFBBBB"
| 2011-11-23 || Loss ||align=left| Makoto Uehara || RISE 85: RISE Heavyweight Tournament 2011, Semi Finals || Tokyo, Japan || Extension round decision (unanimous) || 4 || 3:00 || 4-4
|-
|-  bgcolor="#CCFFCC"
| 2011-11-23 || Win ||align=left| Fabiano Cyclone || RISE 85: RISE Heavyweight Tournament 2011, Quarter Finals || Tokyo, Japan || Decision (majority) || 3 || 3:00 || 4-3
|-
|-  bgcolor="#FFBBBB"
| 2010-07-31 || Loss ||align=left| Jhonata Diniz || Ichigeki Brazil 2010 || São Paulo, Brazil || Decision (unanimous) || 3 || 3:00 || 3-3
|-
|-  bgcolor="#FFBBBB"
| 2010-05-21 || Loss ||align=left| Mladen Brestovac || K-1 World Grand Prix 2010 in Bucharest, Reserve Match || Bucharest, Romania || Decision (unanimous) || 3 || 3:00 || 3-2
|-
|-  bgcolor="#CCFFCC"
| 2009-12-05 || Win ||align=left| Tsutomu Takahagi || K-1 World Grand Prix 2009 Final || Yokohama, Japan || Decision (unanimous) || 3 || 3:00 || 3-1
|-
|-  bgcolor="#CCFFCC"
| 2009-10-03 || Win ||align=left| Espedito da Silva || Ichigeki Brazil 2009 || São Paulo, Brazil || Decision (unanimous) || 3 || 3:00 || 2-1
|-
|-  bgcolor="#FFBBBB"
| 2009-08-11 || Loss ||align=left| Keijiro Maeda || K-1 World Grand Prix 2009 in Tokyo Final 16 Qualifying GP || Tokyo, Japan || KO (right hook) || 3 || 1:20 || 1-1
|-
|-  bgcolor="#CCFFCC"
| 2008-04-19 || Win ||align=left| Antonín Ungerman || Galavečer Bojovníků 2008 || Mladá Boleslav, Bohemia, Czech Republic || KO (left hook) || 1 || 1:22 || 1-0
|-
|-
| colspan=9 | Legend:

External links
 K-1Sport profile

References

Living people
1979 births
Czech male kickboxers
Heavyweight kickboxers
Czech male karateka
Kyokushin kaikan practitioners
Sportspeople from Prague
Sportspeople from Tokyo
Czech expatriate sportspeople in Japan